Don Luis Pacheco de Narváez (1570–1640) was a Spanish writer on destreza, the Spanish art of fencing.

He was a follower of Don Jerónimo Sánchez de Carranza. 
Some of his earlier works were compendia of Carranza's work while his later works were less derivative.
He served as fencing master to King Philip IV of Spain.

Nevertheless, it is not known exactly when Pacheco met his teacher, the greatest master of Spanish fencing, Jerónimo Sanchez de Carranza.

Biography 
Until recently, there has been no information on the exact date of birth of Pacheco de Narváez. Born in the city of Baeza, his life was devoted to working with weapons and becoming a sergeant major in the Canary Islands, namely on the island of Fuerteventura and Lanzarote.

According to documents from the legacy of Pacheco de Narváez in the Canary Islands, it is known that he was the son of Rodrigo Marin de Narváez and Magdalena Pacheco Cameras. He married Beatriz Fernandez de Cordoba, the daughter of Michael Jerome Fernandez de Cordova, clerk of the chamber and secretary of the Royal court of the Canary Islands and Lucia Sayago.

In 1608, he fought a fencing match with Francisco de Quevedo as a result of Quevedo criticizing one of his works. Quevedo took off Pacheco's hat in the first encounter.

In Quevedo's picaresque novel El Buscón, this duel was parodied with a fencer relying on mathematical calculations having to run away from a duel with an experienced soldier.

The life of a swordsman 

Despite the lack of accurate data on the life of Pacheco de Narváez, as well as numerous other masters of medieval fencing, there are often occasional references, from which it is clear that the profession of the fencing master in Spain in the 15th and 16th centuries required serious preparation, extreme physical strength, and organization; thus, there existed a monopoly on teaching and awarding the title of master of the art of fencing.

Don Jerónimo Sánchez de Carranza, a master of fencing and founder of the Spanish school of fencing, destreza, became famous for his written treatise  ('The philosophy of arms and their skill, and of Christian aggression and defense', published in 1582) and became a mentor and fencing teacher for Pacheco de Narváez.

Pacheco de Narváez was a military man who served on both land and sea as a soldier, sergeant, ensign, sergeant major, and later governor.

Libro de las grandezas de la espada 

Libro de las grandezas de la espada ('Book of the Greatness of the sword') by Pacheco de Narváez formed the basis of all 17th-century Spanish fencing literature. The first edition includes all the principles that Narváez handed to Carranza. This book describes a number of secrets, principles and prescriptions, with the help of which anyone can learn and teach others without resorting to the instructions of other masters.

 was written in the city of Seville and is dedicated to Philip III, the "king of all Spain and the greater part of the world". As a pupil of Carranza, Pacheco de Narváez reproduces in detail the inventor's characteristic methods and explains the curious schemes, with drawn circles and positions of the blades relative to each other – in the form of conditional swords, intersecting at different angles depending on the type of movement, the cutting or piercing stroke.

After extensive and detailed arguments on the need for defense, as required by human and divine laws, as well as arguments on the elevation of self-perfection through the art of possession of arms, the author consecrates his wisdom and practice in the art of fencing.

In the middle of the 16th century, the stance according to the school of Spanish fencing was a popular stance in which the trunk is straightened, but so that the heart is not directly opposite the opponent's sword; right arm is straight, legs are not widely spaced. These foundations give three advantages: the point of the sword is directed as close as possible to the enemy, the swordsman holds the sword with more force, and thus eliminates the risk of injuring the elbow. It is not a question of crossing the swords with the enemy.

Fencers need to take a stand outside the distance in order to systematize the general concept of the right distance, Carranza and his follower Narváez represent a circle drawn on the ground – "" an 'imaginary circumference around the opposing bodies', which further outlines the actions.

Carranza paid the most attention to cutting strokes, although he was very free to use stabbing blows in the fight. He presents the exact definition of the first strike, but does not explain the second one in any way. Narváez, however, touched on his work in thrusting strikes, but did not give any detailed explanation as to how he performed it.

Modo fácil y nuevo para examinarse los maestros en la destreza de las armas 

 ('A simple way of examining teachers in the art of fencing with weapons') is another of Pacheco de Narváez's most famous works (a dialogue between a pupil and an exam teacher on the philosophy and art of fencing).

The seal of this work and any publishing house by other persons were prohibited without the appropriate permission. The book at that time was published by the Cabinet of Lazaro de los Ríos, Secretary of the King of Spain, dated 26 February 1625 in Madrid.

This treatise contains a dialogue between the student and his teacher-examiner on the art of fencing and philosophy for obtaining the degree of maestro. In this form of writing, Pacheco de Narváez presented one hundred conclusions or forms of cognition.

Pacheco de Narváez received gratitude from the king and was appointed examiner for all fencing teachers; however, instead of passing the exams, apparently, his comrades decided to unite against him. This can be concluded by analyzing the index  – a list of people who have been enrolled. The index is in the archives of the Supreme Court. It says the following:

The protective pillars described in the treatise meet the requirements, correspond to the laws of justice and peace in the Republic. Each valiant knight was given a crown as a sign of wisdom and skill. Dialogue is based on these two principles. In the text, training with weapons is described. Also in this part, a thorough assessment of the most talented students is conducted. It is said that they are allocated a scholarship for the time devoted to studies. Such a person should be greeted favorably – the other, who from greed desires to receive the honor of receiving a scientific award – should not be despised or avoided working with. The involuntary ignoring of a person is not a significant mistake, but ignorance of what is necessary is disrespect to oneself. And above all, absurd talent and a lack of courage lead to a loss of hope to achieve what is possible, says Pacheco de Narváez.

This treatise is useful in studying the history of the art of possession of weapons, so intellectuals consider it valuable. This book contributed to the re-creation of the art and describes the image of the art of fencing from the date of publication of this was addressed only thanks to various masters of fencing.

Bibliography 

 , Luis Pacheco de Narváez. Orbigo, 1600
 , Luis Pacheco de Narváez por Luis Sanchez, 1612
  Luis Pacheco de Narváez. Claudius Bornat, 1643
 , Luis Pacheco de Narváez, M. Sanchez, 1672
 , Luis Pacheco de Narváez por los herederos de Pedro Lanaja, 1658
 , Luis Pacheco de Narváez, 1642
 , Luis Pacheco de Narváez, Luis Imprenta del Reino (Madrid) 1635

See also 

Gérard (or Girard) Thibault of Antwerp
La Verdadera Destreza

References

Further reading

External links 
 Facsimile of Libro de las grandezas de la Espada 
 Entry for the duel between Quevedo and Pacheco, Destreza Translation and Research Project
 Luis Pacheco de Narváez y Quevedo.
 Paper on the life and works of Luis Pacheco de Narváez by Juan I. Laguna Fdez., «Luis Pacheco de Narváez: Unos comentarios a la vida y escritos del campeón de la corte literaria barroca de Felipe III y Felipe IV, y su supuesta relación con el “Tribunal de la justa venganza” contra Francisco de Quevedo», LEMIR, 20, 2016, pp. 191–324. 
Libro de las grandezas de la espada Luis Pacheco de Narváez Biblioteca Digital Hispánica 
 Antiguos tratados de esgrima Luis Pacheco de Narvaez, Biblioteca Digital Hispánica 

1570 births
1640 deaths
Spanish male fencers
Historical fencing
People from Baeza
Historical European martial arts